Wainy Days is an internet video series starring David Wain that is hosted on the website, My Damn Channel. The web series follows a fictionalized version of Wain through his everyday life as he tries to form relationships with numerous women and discusses his problems with his friends at the sweatshop where he works. Elizabeth Banks, Jonah Hill, Julie Bowen, Megan Mullally, Jason Sudeikis, Rob Corddry, Lake Bell, Amanda Peet, Rosemarie DeWitt, Elizabeth Reaser, Thomas Lennon, Joe Lo Truglio, Josh Charles, Lucy Punch, A.D. Miles, Paul Rudd, Michael Ian Black, Rashida Jones, Michael Showalter and various other Stella/The State/Wet Hot American Summer alumni have all guest-starred in various episodes.  A DVD containing the first four seasons was released February 14, 2012. In 2013, Blip Partnered with My Damn Channel, leading to season 5 of Wainy Days being premiered simultaneously on Blip and MyDamnChannel.

Episodes

Series overview

Season 1: 2007

Season 2: 2007–2008

Season 3: 2008

Season 4: 2009–2010

Season 5: 2011–2012

Awards 
In 2008, Wainy Days won an award and an official honoree from The Webby Awards:
Best Comedy Series
Official Honoree – Individual Episode, “The Future”

References

External links

2007 web series debuts
American comedy web series
American drama web series